The 1893–94 season was the sixth season of The Football League.

Final league tables
The tables below are reproduced here in the exact form that they can be found at the Rec.Sport.Soccer Statistics Foundation website and in Rothmans Book of Football League Records 1888–89 to 1978–79, with home and away statistics separated.

Beginning with the season 1894–95, clubs finishing level on points were separated according to goal average (goals scored divided by goals conceded). In case one or more teams had the same goal difference, this system favoured those teams who had scored fewer goals. The goal average system was eventually scrapped beginning with the 1976–77 season. Since the goal average was used for this purpose for such a long time, it is presented in the tables below even for the seasons prior to 1894–95.

During the first five seasons of the league, that is until this season, 1893–94, re-election process concerned the clubs which finished in the bottom four of the league.

Match results are drawn from The Rec.Sport.Soccer Statistics Foundation website and Rothmans for the First Division and from Rothmans for the Second Division. The result of the match on 25 November 1893 between Wolves and Stoke is given in many newspapers as a win for Wolves by 4–2, which is the result included in these tables and in the book published by the Football League in 1937–38. Most subsequent lists of scores depend on that publication. The Times on Monday, 27th gives the score as 5–2 and local Midland newspapers also show 5–2, listing the five goal scorers. This curious discrepancy has never been explained.

The Second Division was expanded from twelve to fifteen teams, with the election of Liverpool, Middlesbrough Ironopolis, Newcastle United, Rotherham Town and Woolwich Arsenal and the resignation of Accrington and Bootle. Woolwich Arsenal became the first team from the south of England to participate in the Football League.

First Division

Results

Maps

Second Division

Results

Maps

Test matches
The Football League test matches were a set of play-offs, in which the bottom First Division teams faced the top Second Division teams. The First Division teams, if coming out as winners, would retain their places in the division. If a Second Division team won, it would be considered for First Division membership through an election process at the expense of a losing First Division team. Losing Second Division teams would stay in the Second Division.

Consequences
Of the winners, Liverpool and Small Heath (later known as Birmingham City F.C.) were elected into the First Division, while Preston North End remained there.

Of the losers Darwen and Newton Heath (later known as Manchester United F.C.) continued in the Second Division, while Notts County remained there.

See also
1893–94 in English football
1893 in association football
1894 in association football

References

External links

Ian Laschke: Rothmans Book of Football League Records 1888–89 to 1978–79. Macdonald and Jane's, London & Sydney, 1980.

1893-94
1